Simon McGovern (born 25 February 1965) is an English former professional footballer who played as a midfielder.

Career
Born in Bradford, McGovern joined Bradford City in 1979. He joined the first-team in August 1982, making one league appearance for the club. He left the club in March 1984 to play for Phoenix Park, and he also played for Farsley Celtic.

Sources

References

1965 births
Living people
English footballers
Bradford City A.F.C. players
Phoenix Park F.C. players
Farsley Celtic F.C. players
English Football League players
Association football midfielders